Louis J. "Red" Salmon (June 10, 1880 – September 27, 1965) is considered to be the first outstanding fullback for the University of Notre Dame football team. He was the first "Fighting Irish" player to win an All-American mention, and some sports historians argue that he served as the team's de facto coach during the 1902–1903 season. This honor, however, is often accorded to teammate James Farragher. Both men are widely credited as acting head coaches in official histories of the "Fighting Irish" football team, and Salmon is recognized as head coach during the 1903–1904 season.

Playing career
Born in Syracuse, New York, Salmon made his mark in collegiate football in 1903, when (as a senior) he scored 105 points. His career record of 36 touchdowns remained a school standard until 1985.  At six feet and three inches, and 230 pounds, Salmon was a force to be reckoned with on the gridiron. As one writer observed: "The alabaster-skinned Salmon has been described as both a slasher and a smasher, a colorful way of saying he would run right over you if he could not run around you". Moreover, in an era when a wet pigskin might weigh as much as 14 pounds, Salmon averaged 30 yards with his punts. In 1903, Salmon was named to Walter Camp's third All-America team.

Coaching career and legacy
During the 1903–1904 season, Salmon served officially as head coach of the "Fighting Irish". He presided over a lackluster season of 5–4, and as one writer has commented, "The team needed Salmon on the field, not on the sidelines". After graduating with a degree in engineering, the former sports hero rarely returned to campus and underplayed his outstanding athletic career. Nevertheless, he would be remembered as one of collegiate football's "greats". Louis "Red Salmon was inducted into the College Football Hall of Fame in 1971.

Head coaching record

References

Sources
 Sperber, Murray (1993). Shake Down the Thunder: The Creation of Notre Dame Football. New York: Henry Holt and Company. .

External links
 
 

1880 births
1965 deaths
American football fullbacks
College Football Hall of Fame inductees
Notre Dame Fighting Irish football coaches
Notre Dame Fighting Irish football players
Players of American football from Syracuse, New York